David Sánchez was the defending champion, but lost in the second round to José Acasuso.

Acasuso won the title by defeating Igor Andreev 6–3, 6–0 in the final.

Seeds

Draw

Finals

Top half

Bottom half

References

External links
 Main draw (ATP)
 Qualifying draw (ATP)
 ITF tournament profile

Tennis tournaments in Romania
2004 in tennis
Romanian Open